Carlmont High School is a public high school in Belmont, California, United States serving grades 9–12 as part of the Sequoia Union High School District. Carlmont is a California Distinguished School.

Carlmont was founded in 1952 as "a school within a school" at Sequoia High School, with four hundred fifty freshman and sophomore students.

Name 
Its name derives from the campus straddling the two adjacent cities of San Carlos and Belmont (thus the portmanteau of San Carlos + Belmont). Because this hilly area is referred to as "the highlands", the school team was named "The Scots", and the mascot is a kilted Scottish highland warrior, named Carl Monty. Carlmont students come from Belmont, San Carlos, Redwood City, Redwood Shores, and East Palo Alto.

Dangerous Minds 
The novel My Posse Don't Do Homework by LouAnne Johnson and subsequent movie adaptation Dangerous Minds were based upon her experience as a teacher at Carlmont in the 1990s. In the film, the school was named Parkmont. Most of her students were African-Americans and Hispanics bused in to Carlmont from East Palo Alto, a town at the opposite end of the school district from Carlmont.

With the closure of Ravenswood High School in East Palo Alto in the late 1970s, instead of the school district complying with the Brown v. Board of Education (1954)  and Mendez v. Westminster (1947), 2 US Supreme Court rulings that a student is legally required to attend the closest school to their home, the predominantly African-American, Hispanic and Pacific Islander students were forced by the District to be bused to other high schools in the Sequoia High School District, including Carlmont, which had a predominantly Caucasian population at the time.

Staff conduct investigation 
In 2018, the Sequoia Union High School District discussed in a closed meeting the possibility of firing former Vice Principal Jennifer Cho of Carlmont High School for inappropriate relationships with male students. The investigation of Cho's actions emerged from a Change.org petition launched by a former student, which had gained large traction among students and families of Carlmont High School. During the investigation, Cho was placed on administrative leave. In late May, Cho was removed from her position as Vice Principal of Carlmont High School and relocated elsewhere in the district.

This incident followed Cho's previous investigation in 2017, when a former Carlmont coach reported her to the district and Child protective services after overhearing student athletes talking about inappropriate interactions with Cho in the locker room.

Transportation 
Carlmont can be accessed by driving and Samtrans routes 60, 61, 62, 260, and 295.

Demographics (2020–2021 school year) 
 2,309 students: 1,137 Male (49.2%), 1,172 Female (50.8%)

Notable alumni 
 Craig Barrett, former chief executive officer, Intel Corporation.
 Benny Luo, Founder, NextShark, NewMediaRockstars, Forbes 30 Under 30, 2018
 Ryan Boschetti, defensive tackle former National Football League (NFL) defensive lineman.
 Dana Carvey, actor and comedian.
 Tiffany Lam, Class of 1999, former Miss Hong Kong 2002.
 Michelle McLaughlin, Playboy Playmate of the Month for February 2008.
 David Nelson, musician
 Bill Ring, Class of 1975, played for the San Francisco 49ers in the early 1980s.
 Devin Wyman, NFL Linebacker for the New England Patriots.
 Dana Leong, 2011 Grammy Award Winning multi-instrumentalist, composer and producer

See also 

 San Mateo County high schools
 Tierra Linda Middle School (located across the street from Carlmont High)

References

External links 

 
 Scot Scoop News; Carlmont High School's journalism website
 Carlmont High School map and guide

1952 establishments in California
Educational institutions established in 1952
High schools in San Mateo County, California
Public high schools in California